Yaylacık is a village in the Araban District, Gaziantep Province, Turkey. The village is populated by Kurds and had a population of 385 in 2021.

References

Villages in Araban District
Kurdish settlements in Gaziantep Province